Mortise or mortice may refer to:
 Mortise and tenon, a woodworking joint
 Ankle mortise, part of the distal tibia joining the talus bone to form an ankle joint
 Mortise chisel, a type of chisel
 Mortice lock, a lock with a bolt set within the door frame, rather than attached externally